Francisco Sarabia National Airport or Terán Airport (formerly IATA code TGZ, ICAO code MMTG) was a national airport located at Tuxtla Gutiérrez, Chiapas, Mexico. It was used to handle national air traffic for the city of Tuxtla Gutiérrez. As of right now, this airport is closed to civil operations and it is used as Base Aérea Militar No. 6 by the Mexican Air Force. Scheduled airline service for the city is now handled at the new Ángel Albino Corzo International Airport, which has taken over Sarabia's former IATA and ICAO airport codes (as of June 2006). It is now used for military purposes only.

202 Air Squadron 
The 202 Air Squadron is a Mexican Air Force unit operating out Terán Airport. The unit operates Pilatus PC-9 and Pilatus PC-7 planes.

Incidents 
On September 15, 2010, an AeroMexico MD-83 erroneously landed at Teran airport after confusing it with Albino Corzo International Airport. AeroMexico flight 553, operated on behalf of AeroMexico Travel, came from Mexico City and had 80 passengers on board.

References

External links 
 
 

Airports in Chiapas
Tuxtla Gutiérrez